Shafal Mosed is a Yemeni-American who grew up in the suburbs of Buffalo, New York. In 2002, he was arrested and charged as part of the War on Terror together with the other members of the "Lackawanna Six", based on the fact the group of friends had attended an Afghan training camp together years earlier.

Life
Born in Detroit, Michigan, Mosed moved to Lackawanna as a child when his father's automotive job with Ford Motor Company was relocated to the Buffalo plant.

When his father died of a heart attack, Mosed was left in charge of caring for his sickly mother and three younger siblings. The family lived in poverty, as Mosed worked as a telemarketer and took computer courses at the local community college.

Taher, Moseb and Galeb all decided to leave together after Sahim Alwan made it clear he wanted to return home and was unhappy with the tone of the camp. They were driven to Quetta, and rather than wait a day for the next plane, took a bus to Karachi so they could leave Pakistan immediately.

References

American people imprisoned on charges of terrorism
Buffalo Six
Living people
People from Lackawanna, New York
Year of birth missing (living people)